Novy Susadybash (Yañı Susaźıbaş) is a rural locality (a village) in Pevomaysky Selsoviet, Yanaulsky District, Bashkortostan, Russia. The population was 87 as of 2010. There are 2 streets.

Geography 
Novy Susadybash is located 22 km south of Yanaul (the district's administrative centre) by road. Stary Susadybash is the nearest rural locality.

References 

Rural localities in Yanaulsky District